ATP-binding cassette sub-family F member 2 is a protein that in humans is encoded by the ABCF2 gene.

Function 

The protein encoded by this gene is a member of the superfamily of ATP-binding cassette (ABC) transporters. ABC proteins transport various molecules across extra- and intracellular membranes. ABC genes are divided into seven distinct subfamilies (ABC1, MDR/TAP, MRP, ALD, OABP, GCN20, and White). This protein is a member of the GCN20 subfamily. Alternative splicing of this gene results in multiple transcript variants.

ABCF2 acts as a suppressor of the volume-sensitive outwardly rectifying Cl  channel (CLCN3).

See also 
 ATP-binding cassette transporter

References

Further reading

External links 
 
 
 

ATP-binding cassette transporters
Genes on human chromosome 7